Parechinus angulosus, the Cape urchin, is a sea urchin in the family Parechinidae endemic to southern Africa.

Synonyms
Cidaris angulosus Leske, 1778 
Cidaris angulosus minor Leske, 1778 
Echinus angulosus minor (Leske, 1778)
Echinus minimus Blainville, 1825 
Echinus subangulosus Lamarck, 1816 
Parechinus angulosus pallidus H.L. Clark
Parechinus annulatus (Mortensen, 1909) 
Protocentrotus angulosus (Leske, 1778)
Protocentrotus annulatus Mortensen, 1909
Psammechinus subangulosus (Lamarck, 1816)

Description
Test round, diameter up to 60 mm, with a dense covering of short sharp spines which do not exceed 20% of test diameter. Test colour usually green, spines purple, but also green, red or off-white.

Distribution
Lüderitz to Durban, intertidal to about 100 m.

Natural history
Grazes on seaweeds, and population density affects the rate of kelp settlement. Provides shelter for juvenile abalone Haliotis midae and is an important influence on kelp forest ecology. Abundant on flatter areas of rocky reefs in the Cape. Eaten by West coast rock lobster Jasus lalandii.

References

Camarodonta